The Schism Act or Established Church Act (13 Ann., c. 7) was a never-enforced 1714 Act of the Parliament of Great Britain which was repealed in 1718. The Act stipulated that anyone who wished to keep (manage or own) a public or private school, or act as tutor, must first be granted a licence from a bishop. Also, he (or she) must conform to the liturgy of the Church of England and to have taken in the past year the rites of that Church.

The Act sought to constrain, convert or curtail Dissenter schools (dissenting academies), but on the day the Act was due to come into force, Queen Anne died and the Act was never enforced. Upon the Hanoverian succession in 1714 and the subsequent supremacy of Whigs, the Act was repealed by the Religious Worship Act 1718.

References

History of Christianity in the United Kingdom
United Kingdom Education Acts
Great Britain Acts of Parliament 1714
Repealed Great Britain Acts of Parliament